FC Tosno was a professional Russian football club based in Tosno. On 6 May 2017, Tosno won promotion to the 2017–18 Russian Premier League for the first time after securing second place in the Russian National Football League. They were relegated after one season at the top level. On 9 June 2018 it was announced that FC Tosno was dissolved because of financial problems.

History
FC Tosno was officially registered in 2008 by Leonid Khomenko, then director of 'FC Era'. In 2009, FC Tosno and another amateur club, 'Ruan', were merged. The name 'Ruan' was carried by the club till late 2013.

Foundation 
The decision to found a professional club was taken in March 2013, with the support of the club's main sponsor at the time, a holding company named 'Fort Group', and the Regional Public Organization, 'FC Tosno'. Since 2013, FC Tosno have represented the Leningrad Oblast in Russian competitions. In Tosno's first professional season, the club were declared to compete in the West Zone of the Russian Professional Football League. Due to Tosno's then-current home stadium (Tosno Stadium)'s failing to satisfy PFL's minimum requirements, it was required that they move to a different, more capacious stadium for them to be eligible to compete in the division. In the meantime, Tosno were offered to play their home matches at the Petrovskiy Stadium.

The club's first official match took place on 10 July 2013, when they defeated FC Dynamo Vologda in the First Round of the 2013–14 Russian Cup (they reached the quarter-finals that year). This victory marked the start of the club's 22-game 'unbeaten run' in all competitions (18 league games and 4 cup games), which ended on the 27th of October. The following day, head coach Viktor Demidov's contact with the club had terminated. The remaining games of the season had keepers' coach Kirill Gashichev in charge.

PFL Years (2013–14)

Russian Cup 

After signing a contract with Ukrainian manager Oleh Leshchynskyi on 4 March 2014, FC Tosno have defeated FC Spartak Moscow in the 2013–14 Russian Cup Round of 16, with the only goal scored by Valentin Filatov on the 114th minute. It was the fourth time in Russian Cup's history, when a team from the Second Division had participated in the Russian Cup's Quarter-finals.

On 26 March 2014, 'Tosno' were eliminated from the cup in an away game against Krasnodar, which ended 3–0 to the hosts.

On 15 May, Leshchynskyi was fired due to a conflict with the club's players, so Vyacheslav Matyushenko, the team's chairman, had to head the team. On 27 May, after a 1–0 win against FC Tekstilshchik Ivanovo in PFL, FC Tosno had secured a place in the Russian National Football League of the upcoming season.

FNL Years (2014–17) 
Prior to the season's start, Tosno had signed a contract with Bulgarian manager Nikolay Kostov. The first four games were headed by Kirill Gashichev, however, on 30 July Kostov had been officially included in the squad. Tosno had topped the league for the time of Nikolay Kostov's leadership, however, on 5 November the contract with Kostov had terminated and Kirill Gashichev had to head Tosno again. In 2014, under the leadership of Gashichev, the club had finished third with four wins and one loss. 

On 4 December 2014, Aleksandr Grigoryan was appointed the club's new manager on a two-year contract, however Grigoryan left the club on 28 February 2015 without taking charge of first team game for the club due to family circumstances. 

The manager post was then passed to Yevgeni Perevertailo, who guided Tosno to a third-place finish in the league. However, Tosno lost 1:5 on aggregate to Rostov in the play-offs and did not earn promotion to the Russian Premier League.

On 12 August 2015, Dmytro Parfenov was appointed as Tosno's new manager on a two-year contract. Tosno finished the season in 7th position and reached the Round of 16 in the Russian Cup, where the club lost only to future champions Zenit.

At the end of the 2016–17 season, Tosno have earned promotion to the 2017–18 Russian Premier League for the first time.

RFPL Year (2017–2018) 
The 2017–18 season was Tosno's first ever top-tier campaign in Russian football. The club spent much of the league stage of the season struggling in relegation or relegation-playoff places. The cup, on the other hand, saw the team enjoy vast success, reaching the final after defeating reigning champions FC Spartak Moscow in a match that saw them fight back from a one goal deficit in   regular time to seal a close victory in  penalty shoot-outs. They went on to win the final on 9 May 2018, netting two goals and conceding once in a FC Avangard Kursk triumph.

As a consequence of winning the cup, Tosno were qualified to represent Russia in the following season's Europa League group stage, pending UEFA licensing, which would have marked the club's first ever appearance in a major European competition. However, immediately following the cup victory, Russian Football Union president Aleksandr Alayev announced that Tosno had missed the deadlines for UEFA licensing applications and would therefore not be eligible to participate in the competition. They were relegated from the Russian Premier League on the last day of the 2017–18 season after losing 0–5 to FC Ufa.

On 30 May 2018, Russian National Football League announced that Tosno failed on its appeal to obtain the FNL license for the 2018–19 season and will be forced to apply for the third-tier Russian Professional Football League license, sealing a two-level relegation. On 9 June 2018, the founder of FORT Group (the company that owned the team), Maxim Levchenko, announced that the team is officially dissolved.

Domestic history

Stadium
In November 2014, it was announced that FC Tosno are planning to build a new home stadium in Tosno. Its capacity was expected to be over 10,000 seats and it was to be completed before the start of the 2015–16 season. Those plans were not realised.

In the 2017–18 season, the club played their home games at the Petrovsky stadium in St. Petersburg, which previously hosted the home matches of FC Zenit. The stadium has a capacity of 20,985.

Honours
Russian Cup (1): 2017–18
Russian Professional Football League (1): 2013–14, West Zone

Timeline of head coaches 
Number represents chronological order. 
Information correct as of May 2018.

Notable players
Had international caps for their respective countries. Players whose name is listed in bold represented their countries while playing for Tosno.

Russia
 Vladimir Bystrov
 Arseny Logashov
 Pavel Pogrebnyak
 Yegor Sorokin
 Anton Zabolotny

Former USSR countries
 David Yurchenko
 Dzyanis Laptsew
 Otar Martsvaladze
 Giorgi Navalovski
 Nukri Revishvili
 Artem Milevskyi
 Vagiz Galiulin

Europe
 Ante Vukušić
 Mladen Kašćelan
 Nemanja Mijušković
 Marcin Kowalczyk
 Marko Poletanović
Africa
 Nuno Rocha

References

External links
  Official website

 
Defunct football clubs in Russia
Sport in Leningrad Oblast
Association football clubs established in 2013
2013 establishments in Russia
Association football clubs disestablished in 2018
2018 disestablishments in Russia